{{DISPLAYTITLE:Theta1 Sagittarii}}

Theta1 Sagittarii (θ1 Sagittarii) is a close binary star system in the zodiac constellation of Sagittarius. It is visible to the naked eye with an apparent visual magnitude of 4.37. Based upon an annual parallax shift of 6.29 mas as seen from Earth, this star is located around 520 light years from the Sun. At that distance, the visual magnitude is diminished by an extinction factor of 0.24 due to interstellar dust.

This is a single-lined spectroscopic binary with an orbital period of just 2.1 days in a circular orbit. The visible member, component A, is a B-type subgiant star with a stellar classification of B3 IVp. It is around 33 million years old and is spinning with a projected rotational velocity of 73 km/s. The primary has 6.6 times the mass of the Sun and about 5.6 times the Sun's radius. It is radiating 2,271 times the solar luminosity from its photosphere at an effective temperature of 17,900 K.

References

B-type subgiants
Spectroscopic binaries
Sagittarii, Theta
Sagittarius (constellation)
Durchmusterung objects
189103
98412
7623